Empress Kezuhun (可足渾皇后) may refer to the following Xianbei empresses of the Former Yan state:

Empress Dowager Kezuhun ( 353–369), Murong Jun's wife, also empress dowager during her son Murong Wei's reign
Empress Kezuhun (Murong Wei's wife) ( 369), Murong Wei's wife

Kezuhun